The Man Who Sold Himself is the third collaborative album by Porcupine Tree drummer Gavin Harrison and multi-instrumentalist and vocalist 05Ric. It was released on the Burning Shed record label in February 2012.

Track listing
All songs written by Gavin Harrison & 05Ric
 "Prize" – 4:29
 "Identitas" – 5:49
 "The Man Who Sold Himself" – 3:32
 "Own" – 3:42
 "Body Temple" – 5:03
 "107" – 4:00
 "Wherewithal" – 4:55
 "Awake" – 3:56 
 "Illusion" – 3:33
 "Way" – 3:21

Personnel
Gavin Harrison – drums, guitar & bass 
05Ric – touch guitars & vocals
Gary Sanctuary – piano on track 1
Jon Astley – mastering

References

External links
GH05ric MySpace page

2012 albums